Zanagu (also Romanized as Zanagū and Zanakū) is a village in Seh Qaleh Rural District, Seh Qaleh District, Sarayan County, South Khorasan Province, Iran. At the 2006 census, its population was 569, in 150 families.

References 

Populated places in Sarayan County